Pepper Creek is a stream approximately 8 mi (13 km) long in southern Delaware in the United States.

It rises in Cypress Swamp in southern Sussex County, approximately 3 mi (5 km) north of the Maryland state line. It flows generally east-northeast, past Dagsboro and into Indian River Bay, an inlet of the Atlantic Ocean, approximately 2 mi (3 km) northwest of Millville.

The upper course of the creek is connected by channelized ditches through Cypress Swamp to the headwaters of the Pocomoke River.

See also
List of Delaware rivers

References

Rivers of Delaware
Rivers of Sussex County, Delaware